Lymaenon is a genus of wasps belonging to the family Mymaridae.

The genus has cosmopolitan distribution.

Species:

Lymaenon hoplites 
Lymaenon spinozai 
Lymaenon vladimiri

References

Mymaridae
Hymenoptera genera